The Wallis and Futuna national rugby union team represents Wallis and Futuna in rugby union. The team's first international match was against Papua New Guinea, who beat them 54–5 in 1966.  Wallis and Futuna recorded their first, and as yet only, victory against Tahiti, winning 3–0 away from home in 1971. The team has not played since 1971 and is currently inactive.

Rugby sevens is now the preferred rugby format in Wallis and Futuna.

See also
 Rugby union in Wallis and Futuna
 Wallis and Futuna Rugby Committee

References
 Wallis and Futuna rugby statistics
  

Rugby union in Wallis and Futuna
Oceanian national rugby union teams
R